The 4th Cinemalaya Independent Film Festival was held from July 11 until 20, 2008 in Metro Manila, Philippines.

Entries
The winning film is highlighted with boldface and a dagger.

Full-Length Features

Short films

Awards

Full-Length Features
 Best Film - Jay by Francis Xavier Pasion
 Special Jury Prize - Brutus, Ang Paglalakbay by Tara Illenberger
 Audience Award - 100 by Chris Martinez
 Best Direction - Chris Martinez for 100
 Best Actor - Baron Geisler for Jay
 Best Actress - Mylene Dizon for 100
 Best Supporting Actor - Yul Servo for Brutus, Ang Paglalakbay
 Best Supporting Actress - Eugene Domingo for 100
 Best Screenplay - Chris Martinez for 100
 Best Cinematography - Dan Villegas for Huling Pasada and Jay Abello for Brutus, Ang Paglalakbay
 Best Sound - Allan Hilado for Ranchero
 Best Editing - Kats Serraon, Chuck Gutierrez, Francis Xavier Pasion for Jay
 Best Original Music Score - Joey Ayala for Brutus, Ang Paglalakbay
 Best Production Design - Cristina Honrado for Baby Angelo
 Special Citation - Angan-Angan by Sheron Dayoc

Short Films
 Best Short Film - Andong by Rommel Tolentino
 Special Jury Prize - My Pet by Anna G. Bigornia
 Audience Award - God Only Knows by Mark V. Reyes
 Best Direction - Mark V. Reyes for God Only Knows
 Best Screenplay - Rommel Tolentino for Andong

References

External links
Cinemalaya Independent Film Festival

Cinemalaya Independent Film Festival
Cine
Cine
2008 in Philippine cinema